Mrinalini Puranik is lead scientist at Unilever Limited. Her areas of research include biomolecular spectroscopy, Raman spectroscopy of proteins, and nucleic acids. She started her career as associate professor at Indian Institute of Science Education and Research, Pune (IISER). In 2015, her article "Solution structures of purine base analogues 9-deazaguanine and 9-deazahypoxanthine" was published by the Journal of Biomolecular Structure and Dynamics.

Puranik studied for her M.Sc in Physics from University of Pune. Puranik was a Chevening Rolls-Royce Science and Innovation Leadership Programme (CRISP) scholar at University of Oxford.

References

Indian women biologists
Savitribai Phule Pune University alumni
Indian biochemists
Academic staff of the Indian Institute of Science
Indian women physicists
Alumni of the University of Oxford
Year of birth missing (living people)
Living people